William Firmatus (1026–1103) was a Norman hermit and pilgrim of the eleventh century, now venerated as a saint in the Catholic Church.

Life
William Firmatus was a canon and a physician of Tours, France. Following a spiritual prompting against greed, he gave away all his possessions to the poor. He lived a reclusive life with his mother until he entered a hermitage near Laval, Mayenne. He spent the rest of his life on pilgrimages and as a hermit at Savigny and Mantilly.

According to legend, he saved the people of Choilley-Dardenay during drought by striking the ground with his pilgrim's staff, which caused a spring of water to bubble up. He died in 1103 of natural causes.

Relationship with wild animals
William is especially noted for his love of wildlife and the unusual level of communication he seemed to have with animals. This was so much so that the local people used to ask his help with animals that raided their crops. One particular story to this effect involves a wild boar, which William is said to have led by the ear from a farmer's plot, instructing it to fast for the night in a solitary cell.

The Little Bollandists go on to record, along with the boar miracle, that

Veneration
Upon William's death, three townships disputed possession of his remains. The winner was Mortain, which, to procure the relics, used the full force of "its entire clergy and an innumerable crowd of its people".

Saint William is also venerated at Savigny and Mantilly. Catholic Encyclopedia mentions William in its article on Coutances, which  accords him special honor as well, and mentions his patronage of the collegiate church of Mortain. He is a patron against headaches.

Iconography
In art, Saint William is often shown thrusting his arm into a fire. Also, he may be depicted with a raven, which is guiding him as a pilgrim to the Holy Land.

References

Medieval French saints
French hermits
1026 births
1103 deaths
12th-century Christian saints
Clergy from Tours, France